The Watertown Cubs  were a minor league baseball team based in Watertown, South Dakota. The Cubs played as members of the Class D level Dakota League in 1921 and 1922 and South Dakota League in 1923, hosting home games at Riverside Park.

History 
Minor league baseball first began in Watertown, South Dakota when the 1921 Watertown Cubs became members of the eight–team Class D level Dakota League. In their first season of play, the Cubs finished the 1921 season with a 44–53 record, placing 6th under manager Mattie McGrath. Watertown finished 20.5 games behind the 1st place Mitchell Kernels. The team played home games at Riverside Park.

In 1922, the Watertown Cubs played in the final season of the Dakota League, which continued as an eight–team, Class D level league. Watertown finished in 6th place with a 42–54 regular season record. Playing under manager John Mokate, the Cubs finished 17.5 games behind the 1st place Mitchell Kernels.

To minimize travel, the Dakota League was divided into two Class D level leagues in 1923. The two new leagues, each with four teams, were the  South Dakota League and the North Dakota League in 1923. The Watertown Cubs played in the 1923 South Dakota League and finished last as the league folded during the season. When the South Dakota League folded on July 17, 1923, the Cubs ended the season with a record of 15–41 record under manager Wib Smith, placing 4th, finishing 19.5.0 games behind the 1st place Sioux Falls Soos.

The Watertown Cubs were followed by the Watertown Lake Sox, a Basin League collegiate summer team, who played from 1954 to 1962. The Watertown Expos resumed minor league play in Watertown in 1971 as an affiliate of the Montreal Expos, playing in the  Northern League.

The ballpark
The Watertown Cubs played home minor league games at Riverside Park. Today, Riverside Park is still in use as a public park.

Timeline

Year–by–year records

Notable alumni

Wib Smith (1923, MGR)
Jerry Standaert (1922)
Lefty Taber (1921)

See also
Watertown Cubs players

References

External links
Baseball Reference

Professional baseball teams in South Dakota
Defunct baseball teams in South Dakota
Baseball teams established in 1921
Baseball teams disestablished in 1923
Watertown, South Dakota
Codington County, South Dakota
Dakota League teams
South Dakota League teams